Eurobin railway station was located on the Bright line serving the town of Eurobin in Victoria. It opened on 17 October 1890 and closed on 30 November 1983. A new shelter and toilet buildings have been constructed on the site of the former station as part of the Murray to the Mountains Rail Trail.

References

Disused railway stations in Victoria (Australia)
Railway stations in Australia opened in 1890
Railway stations closed in 1983